Raines v. Byrd, 521 U.S. 811 (1997), was a United States Supreme Court case in which the Court held individual members of Congress do not automatically have standing to litigate the constitutionality of laws affecting Congress as a whole.

Background of the case
The Line Item Veto Act of 1996 allowed the president to nullify certain provisions of appropriations bills, and disallowed the use of funds from canceled provisions for offsetting deficit spending in other areas.

At its passage, the Act was politically controversial, with many Democrats breaking with Clinton to oppose it. Of the opposition, six members of Congress, including Republican Mark Hatfield, sued to prevent use of the line-item veto. U.S. District Court Judge Thomas Penfield Jackson found the Act unconstitutional.

Opinion of the Court
The Supreme Court held that the plaintiffs lacked standing to sue, as they had not suffered any particularized injury. The courts reasoning held that individual members of Congress were subject to strict limits on their ability to sue, particularly in a dispute between different branches of government.

Subsequent events
After taking effect, the Act was in 1998 found unconstitutional in Clinton v. City of New York.

References

External links
 

1997 in United States case law
United States Constitution Article Three case law
United States Supreme Court cases
United States Supreme Court cases of the Rehnquist Court